El Ogla may refer to:
El Ogla, Tébessa, a town in Tébessa Province, Algeria
El Ogla, El Oued, a town in El Oued Province, Algeria